Vijaysinh Shankarao Mohite-Patil (born 12 June 1944) is a politician from the Nationalist Congress Party and Member of Parliament (MP) for Madha in Maharashtra since the 2014 general election. He is member of Nationalist Congress Party.

Prior to that he served as the Deputy Chief Minister of Maharashtra. He was also a Minister for Public Works Department (PWD) and Tourism and Rural Development for over 25 years.

Political career
Mohite-Patil started his career as Sarpanch of Akluj in Solapur district. He served as President of Solapur Zila Parishad from 1971 to 1979,
 and was MLA representing Malshiras from 1980 to 2009. In that time he established sugar factories, milk dairies and processing industries, poultry farms, schools, nursing, engineering and D.Ed College in Malshiras. On 25 December 2003 he was sworn in as the Deputy Chief Minister of Maharashtra. He has served as a cabinet Minister of PWD, Tourism and Rural Development Ministry.

In the 2009 Maharashtra assembly elections, his constituency Malshiras became a Reserved Seat, forcing him to shift to the neighbouring Pandharpur seat. He was defeated in the elections that followed by Bharat Bhalke. NCP president Sharad Pawar eventually named him president of the Maharashtra State Co-operative Sugar Factories Federation. In the 2014 Lok Sabha election, he was elected as Member of Parliament from Madha constituency.

Positions held

Akluj Gram Panchayat- Member, Sarpanch
Solapur Zilla Parishad- Member, President (From 1971 to 1979)
State Assembly-Malshiras Constituency-MLA (From 1980 to 2009)
Deputy CM. Maharashtra State (25 December 2003 – 1 November 2005)
Minister of PWD
Minister of Tourism
Minister of Rural Development
Chairman- Ethanol Manufacturers association of India.
Chairman- Maharashtra Rajya Sakhar Sangh (State Sugar Cooperatives Federation)
MLC – Nominated by Governor (4 May 2012 – 16 May 2014 )
Member of Parliament – Madha (16 May 2014 – 2019)

Family

He and his wife Nandinidevi have a son Ranjitsinh and a daughter Renuka Karnik.

Vijaysinh's wedding in 1971 attracted a lot of controversy and criticism due to having 100,000 dinner guests during a period of severe drought in Maharashtra.

See also
Sundarrao Solanke-Patil
Vilasrao Deshmukh
Sharad Pawar
Bharat Bhalke
Hanumant Dolas

References

Living people
1944 births
People from Solapur district
People from Akluj
Maharashtra MLAs 2004–2009
Marathi politicians
Deputy Chief Ministers of Maharashtra
Members of the Maharashtra Legislative Council
India MPs 2014–2019
Lok Sabha members from Maharashtra
Maharashtra district councillors
Nationalist Congress Party politicians from Maharashtra
Indian National Congress politicians
Bharatiya Janata Party politicians from Maharashtra